Jean de Glymes was the name of several members of the nobility in the Habsburg Netherlands.

 John III of Glymes (1452–1532), Lord of Bergen op Zoom
 John IV of Glymes (1528–1567), Marquis of Bergen
 Jean de Glymes, Lord of Waterdijk (died 1583)